Allan Victor Oliveira Mota (born 4 April 2000), commonly known as Allanzinho, is a Brazilian footballer who plays as a forward for Joinville, on loan from Santos.

Club career
Born in Bertioga, São Paulo, Allanzinho began his career with Portuguesa. On 9 April 2019, he terminated his contract with the club after alleging unpaid wages and joined Santos, being initially assigned to the under-20s.

Shortly after arriving, Allanzinho was promoted to Santos' first team by manager Jorge Sampaoli, and spent several months of the campaign training with the squad. On 24 June 2020, he renewed his contract until 2024.

On 25 February 2021, Allanzinho made his first team – and Série A – debut, coming on as a second-half substitute for Arthur Gomes in a 0–2 away loss against Bahia. He made his Copa Libertadores debut on 18 May, replacing Ângelo in a 1–2 away loss against The Strongest.

On 9 June 2021, Allanzinho was loaned to Série B side Guarani until the end of the year. He scored his first professional goal on 16 July, netting his team's fourth in a 4–1 away win against Confiança.

On 16 August 2022, Allanzinho was loaned to Tombense in the second division, until the end of the year. The following 10 February, he moved to Joinville also in a temporary deal.

Career statistics

References

External links
Santos FC profile 

2000 births
Living people
Footballers from São Paulo (state)
Brazilian footballers
Association football forwards
Campeonato Brasileiro Série A players
Campeonato Brasileiro Série B players
Santos FC players
Guarani FC players
Tombense Futebol Clube players
Joinville Esporte Clube players